Christopher of Sweden - Swedish: Kristoffer and Kristofer - may refer to:

Christopher III of Denmark, also King of Sweden 1440
Christopher Vasa, Swedish prince 1598, son of King Sigmund, his mother the Queen and he both died at his birth